Alpavit (also Romanized as Ālpāvīt; also known as Ālpāvet) is a village in Bozkosh Rural District, in the Central District of Ahar County, East Azerbaijan Province, Iran. At the 2006 census, its population was 122, in 21 families.

Name 
According to Vladimir Minorsky, the name of this village is derived from the Mongolian word alpā'ut, referring to "a privileged class".

References 

Populated places in Ahar County